The 2006 FIFA Beach Soccer World Cup CONMEBOL qualifier, also later and commonly known as the 2006 South American Beach Soccer Championship, was the first Beach Soccer World Cup qualification championship for South America, held from March 5–12 in Macaé, Brazil.

The qualifiers were not coordinated by CONMEBOL at the time. The event was instead organised by Beach Soccer Worldwide (BSWW), under the title of FIFA Beach Soccer World Cup Qualifier. CONMEBOL first recognised the tournament in 2013, under the title South American Beach Soccer Championship, also acknowledging the 2006–11 events as historic editions of the championship. CONMEBOL eventually began organising the qualifiers in 2017, under a new title.

Hosts Brazil won the championship, with Uruguay finishing second. Argentina won the third place play-off to claim third. These three nations moved on to play in the 2006 FIFA Beach Soccer World Cup in Rio de Janeiro, Brazil from November 2–12.

Competing nations

 (hosts)

Group stage

Day 1

Day 2

Day 3

Day 4

Day 5

Knockout stage

Winners

Awards

Final standings

References

FIFA Beach Soccer World Cup qualification (CONMEBOL)
2006 in beach soccer
Beach
CONMEBOL Beach Soccer Championship
Beach soccer in Brazil
International association football competitions hosted by Brazil